were an idol group formed by Masahiro Mizuguchi, a producer for Fuji TV who had the idea of creating "an Onyanko Club for the Heisei era (1989-2019)". They debuted in 1998 with the single "Dakishimete". Their name comes from the phrase "Check it!", a catchphrase of Tomoe Shinohara.

There were several things about Checkicco that were similar to Onyanko Club. Like Onyanko Club, Checkicco also hosted their own TV show, called DAIBAtteki!. Each member also had her own number (ID) just like Onyanko Club's members did.

Checkicco broke up on November 3, 1999. At the Girl Pop Factory 2004 event, however, the members performed together as Checkicco again for only one day.

Anime theme singer Mikuni Shimokawa and gravure idol Asami Kumakiri are two well-known former Checkicco members.

Releases
Checkicco has released six singles, two albums (counting their best-of album), a small number of IVs, a photobook, and a Dreamcast game. They had several subgroups such as chee's, METAMO, and M@M, however, they were not very successful (their highest selling single, "Hajimari", only sold 32,450 copies with its highest rank as 40 — this was back in the days when best-selling CDs were the ones that sold over 100,000 copies).

Members
ID001: Rina Tanaka
ID002: Mikuni Shimokawa
ID003: Miki Yahagi
ID004: Rika Arai
ID005: Megumi Igarashi
ID006: Asami Kumakiri
ID007: Aimi Ueda
ID008: Eriko Yoshioka
ID009: Megumi Machida
ID010: Marina Kushi
ID011: Emiko Sasaki
ID012: Mami Fujioka
ID013: Megumi Nozaki
ID014: Ran Shimano
ID015: Tomoko Mori
ID016: Eriko Matsumoto
ID017: Mayu Katō
ID018: Satomi Kaida
ID019: Hiromi Kobayashi
ID020: Ayano Ōtaki
ID021: Yuka Ōta

1998 establishments in Japan
1999 disestablishments in Japan
Japanese girl groups
Japanese idol groups
Japanese pop music groups
Musical groups disestablished in 1999
Musical groups established in 1998
Musical groups from Tokyo